You're Thirteen, You're Beautiful, and You're Mine is a live EP by Australian pub rock band Cold Chisel, recorded at the Regent Theatre in Sydney in October 1978, and released in November. After a long period of unavailability, the EP was re-released as a bonus disc with the second pressing of the compilation album Chisel (1991). The EP was later made available digitally, as well as reissued on disc in 2011.

Details

The title is a parody of the song "You're Sixteen" by the Sherman Brothers, which was popularized in 1960 by Johnny Burnette and in 1973 by Ringo Starr. Barnes later said, "At this stage, we were listening to Jerry Lee Lewis and somebody suggested we call the EP 'You're Sixteen, You're Beautiful and You're Mine' after the Jerry Lee Lewis song. I thought because Jerry Lee married his 13-year-old cousin...." (Note 'You're Sixteen' was not, however, by Lewis). Walker later said the title was "dreamed up at a drunken recording session, and obviously ten thousand other people thought it was funny too."

The front and back cover of the album feature some female nudity, courtesy of a flatmate of Barnes' then girlfriend. Barnes describes it as, "the best photo shoot we ever did." This is the only Cold Chisel album to date which features nudity as part of the cover art. Photographer Greg Noakes said, "the band said they knew of a great toilet for the shoot."

It is speculated that the b-sides of 1979's "Choirgirl" singles (7" and 12") are out-takes from this Regent Theatre performance ("Conversations" and "Khe Sanh" respectively).   During the fade in to "Conversations" Barnes can be heard telling the audience, "Keep it up and we'll play "God Save The Queen"".  According to his memoir, Working Class Man, Cold Chisel played "God Save The Queen" (Australia's national anthem in 1978) as their opening song at this concert, jokingly intended to compel the entire audience to stand up.   (The audience had remained seated during the preceding set by Midnight Oil.)

Reception
Reviewed at the time of release, Juke Magazine said, "Recorded live, Cold Chisel have real fire, an awesome momentum and a bright sound, all of which were completely stifled by the inhibiting surrounding of the studio. Ian Moss shows how inspired he can be with the reins off, and the rest of the band do likewise.

Track listing
All songs by Don Walker except "Wild Thing" by Chip Taylor 

Side one
 "One Long Day"
 "Home and Broken Hearted"

Side two
 "Merry-Go-Round"
 "Mona and the Preacher"
 "Wild Thing"

1982's German release of the EP is noteworthy:  the a-side runs at 45 r.p.m and the b-side (some pressings) runs at 33 1/3 r.p.m.   Additionally, the tracks have been re-ordered:

Side one
 "Wild Thing"

Side two
 "Merry-Go-Round"
 "Mona and the Preacher"
 "One Long Day"
"Home and Broken Hearted"

Charts

Certifications

Personnel
 Jimmy Barnes - vocals
 Don Walker - organ, piano
 Ian Moss - guitar, lead vocal on "One Long Day", backing vocals.
 Steve Prestwich - drums
 Phil Small - bass

References

1978 debut EPs
Cold Chisel albums
1978 live albums
Live EPs
Elektra Records live albums
Elektra Records EPs